Ousseni Zongo (born 6 August 1984 in Ouagadougou) is a Burkinabé professional footballer who plays for Omani club Muscat Club as a midfielder.

References

External links

1984 births
Living people
Sportspeople from Ouagadougou
Burkinabé footballers
Association football midfielders
Planète Champion players
R.S.C. Anderlecht players
FC Wacker Innsbruck (2002) players
Maltese Premier League players
Msida Saint-Joseph F.C. players
Valletta F.C. players
Mosta F.C. players
Naxxar Lions F.C. players
Primeira Liga players
Liga Portugal 2 players
Segunda Divisão players
U.D. Leiria players
Gil Vicente F.C. players
F.C. Arouca players
C.D. Tondela players
G.D. Fabril players
Burkina Faso international footballers
Burkinabé expatriate footballers
Expatriate footballers in Belgium
Expatriate footballers in Austria
Expatriate footballers in Malta
Expatriate footballers in Portugal
Expatriate footballers in Oman
21st-century Burkinabé people
Burkinabé expatriate sportspeople in Austria
Burkinabé expatriate sportspeople in Malta
Burkinabé expatriate sportspeople in Portugal
Burkinabé expatriate sportspeople in Belgium
Burkinabé expatriate sportspeople in Oman